Big Bend National Park is an American national park located in West Texas, bordering Mexico. The park has national significance as the largest protected area of Chihuahuan Desert topography and ecology in the United States, and was named after a large bend in the Rio Grande/Río Bravo. The park protects more than 1,200 species of plants, more than 450 species of birds, 56 species of reptiles, and 75 species of mammals. Additional park activities include scenic drives, programs led by Big Bend park rangers, and stargazing.

The area has a rich cultural history, from archeological sites dating back nearly 10,000 years to more recent pioneers, ranchers, and miners. The Chisos Mountains are located in the park, and are the only mountain range in the United States to be fully contained within the boundary of a national park. Geological features in the park include sea fossils and dinosaur bones, as well as volcanic dikes.

Because the Rio Grande serves as an international boundary, the park faces unusual constraints while administering and enforcing park rules, regulations, and policies. In accordance with the Treaty of Guadalupe Hidalgo, the park's territory extends only to the center of the deepest river channel as the river flowed in 1848. The rest of the channel and the land south of it lies within Mexican territory. The park is bordered by the protected areas of Cañón de Santa Elena and Maderas del Carmen in Mexico.

Geography and climate

According to the Köppen climate classification system, Big Bend National Park has a hot arid climate (BWh).

The park exhibits dramatic contrasts and its climate may be characterized as one of extremes. Dry and hot late spring and summer days often exceed  in the lower elevations. Winters are normally mild but subfreezing temperatures occasionally occur. These variations contribute to an exceptional diversity in plant and animal habitats. Some species in the park, such as the Chisos oak (Quercus graciliformis), are found nowhere else in the United States.

The  of river that form the southern park boundary include the spectacular canyons of Santa Elena, Mariscal, and Boquillas. The Rio Grande, which meanders through this portion of the Chihuahuan Desert, has cut deep canyons with nearly vertical walls through three uplifts made primarily of limestone. Throughout the open desert areas, the highly productive Rio Grande riparian zone includes numerous plant and animal species and significant cultural resources. The vegetative belt extends into the desert along creeks and arroyos.

The park's Chisos Mountains are sky islands surrounded by desert. A significant part of the park's tremendous biodiversity is represented by isolated populations of plants and animals found in the Chisos Mountains and in many of the desert springs distributed across the park.

South of the border lie the Mexican states of Chihuahua and Coahuila and newly protected areas for flora and fauna, which are regions known as the Maderas del Carmen and the Cañón de Santa Elena.

History

During the early historic period (before 1535) several Indian groups were recorded as inhabiting the Big Bend. The Chisos Indians were a loosely organized group of nomadic hunters and gatherers who probably practiced limited agriculture on a seasonal basis. The origin of the Chisos Indians is not known. Linguistically, they were associated with the Conchos Indians of northern Chihuahua and northwestern Coahuila. Their language group spoke a variation of Uto-Aztecan, a language whose speakers ranged from central Mexico to the Great Basin of the U.S.

The Jumano was a nomadic group that traveled and traded throughout West Texas and southeastern New Mexico, but some historic records indicate they were enemies of the Chisos. Around the beginning of the 18th century, the Mescalero Apaches began to invade the Big Bend region and displaced the Chisos Indians. One of the last Native American groups to use the Big Bend was the Comanches, who passed through the park along the Comanche Trail on their way to and from periodic raids into the Mexican interior. These raids continued until the mid-19th century. The last of the great military leaders of the native peoples of the region was an Apache of Spanish ancestry named Alzate, who was active as late as the late 1860s.

The European presence in the region begins circa 1535 AD with the first Spanish explorations into this portion of North America. The expedition of Álvar Núñez Cabeza de Vaca passed near the Big Bend and was followed by other expeditions. Some of these expeditions were searching for gold and silver, or farm and ranch land. Others, such as those by the Franciscan missionaries, were intended to establish centers in which the natives could be evangelized. In an attempt to protect the northern frontier of the New Spain, from which emerged present-day Mexico, a line of presidios, or forts, was established along the Rio Grande in the late 18th century. The Presidio de San Vicente was built near present-day San Vicente, Coahuila, and the Presidio de San Carlos was built near present-day Manuel Benavides, Chihuahua. Some of the presidios were soon abandoned, because of financial difficulties and because they could not effectively stop Indian intrusions into Mexico. The soldiers and settlers of these presidios moved to newer presidios where the interests of the Spanish Empire were more defensible. Such was the case of Santa Rosa Maria del Sacramento, now Muzquiz, Coahuila.

Very little study has been made of the Spanish occupation of the Big Bend following the abandonment of the presidios. The region became a part of Mexico when it achieved its independence from Spain in 1821. Mexican families lived in the area when English-speaking settlers began arriving following the secession of Texas during the latter half of the 19th century.

Following the end of the Mexican–American War in 1848, the U.S. Army made military surveys of the uncharted land of the Big Bend. Forts and outposts were established across Trans-Pecos Texas to protect migrating settlers from Indian attacks. A significant proportion of the soldiers in the late 1800s were African American and came to be called the "buffalo soldiers", a name that was apparently given to them by the Native Americans. Lieutenant Henry Flipper, the first American of African ancestry to graduate from West Point, served in Shafter, Texas, near the end of the 19th century. (Shafter, named for General William R. Shafter, lies west of the Big Bend along the highway from Presidio to Marfa.) Ranchers began to settle in the Big Bend about 1880, and by 1900, sheep, goat, and cattle ranches occupied most of the area. The delicate desert environment was soon overgrazed.

In the late 19th and early 20th centuries, valuable mineral deposits were discovered and brought by settlers who worked in the mines or supported the mines by farming or by cutting timber for the mines and smelters. Communities sprang up around the mines. Boquillas and Terlingua both resulted from mining operations. During this period, the Rio Grande flood plain was settled by farmers. Settlements developed with names like Terlingua Abajo, San Vicente, La Coyota, and Castolon. Often, no more than clusters of families were living and farming in the same area, and they were successful only to the degree that the land was able to support them.

In May 1916, a raid on Glenn Springs received national attention, motivating President Wilson to issued orders for the mobilization of the Texas National Guard to aid federal forces along the border. A permanent cavalry camp was established at Glenn Springs in 1916 and remained until 1920, when the border situation improved.

Establishing a park
In the 1930s, many people who loved the Big Bend country saw that it was a land of unique contrast and beauty that was worth preserving for future generations. In 1933, the Texas Legislature passed legislation to establish Texas Canyons State Park. Later that year, the park was redesignated Big Bend State Park. In 1935, the United States Congress passed legislation that would enable the acquisition of the land for a national park. The State of Texas deeded the land that it had acquired to the federal government, and on June 12, 1944, Big Bend National Park became a reality. The park opened to visitors on July 1, 1944.

Geology

The oldest recorded tectonic activity in the park is related to the Paleozoic Marathon orogeny, although Proterozoic events (over 550 Mya) possibly have some deep control. The Marathon orogeny (part of the Ouachita-Marathon-Sonora orogenic belt) is part of thrusting of rocks from the South American Plate over the North American Plate. This can be best seen in the Persimmon Gap area of the park. This orogenic event is linked to the lack of Triassic- and Jurassic-age rocks in the park.

Between the Triassic and the Cretaceous, the South American Plate rifted from the North American Plate, resulting in the deposition of the Glen Rose Limestone, Del Carmen Limestone, Sue Peaks Formation, Santa Elena Limestone, Del Rio Clay, Buda Limestone, and Boquillas formations (preserved in the Sierra del Carmen–Santiago Mountains, Nine Point Mesa, Mariscal Mountain, and Mesa de Anguila areas).  Also during this time, the Chihuahua trough formed as the Gulf of Mexico opened, which resulted in east–west striking normal faulting. As a result of this depositional time, dinosaur, forest and other fossils are preserved in the park.

Following the ending of rifting in the Late Cretaceous to the early Cenozoic, the Big Bend area was subjected to the Laramide orogeny. This period of (now east–west) compression caused the northeast-facing Mesa de Anguila (an uplifted monocline on the park's southwest margin), the southwest-facing Sierra del Carmen–Santiago Mountains (an uplifted and thrust-faulted monocline that forms the park's boundary on the east) and the Tornillo Basin. During the middle Cenozoic, most of the volcanic rocks, including the Chisos Group, the Pine Canyon caldera complex, and the Burro Mesa Formation, formed.

The most recent tectonic activity in the park is basin and range faulting from the Neogene to Quaternary. This period of east–west extension has resulted in Estufa and Dehalo bolsons in the Chisos Mountains, as well as the Terlingua and Sierra del Carmen, Chalk Draw, and Burro Mesa Faults. The Rio Grande has entered the Big Bend area roughly 2 million years ago, and since then, extensive erosion and downcutting have occurred.

Cultural resources
Cultural resources in the park range from the Paleo-Indian period 10,500 years ago through the historic period represented by Native American groups, such as the Chisos, Mescaleros, and Comanche. More recently, Spanish, Mexican, Anglo, and Irish settlers farmed, ranched, and mined in the area.

Throughout the prehistoric period, humans found shelter and maintained open campsites throughout the park. The archeological record reveals an Archaic-period desert culture, whose inhabitants developed a nomadic hunting and gathering lifestyle that remained virtually unchanged for several thousand years.

The historic cultural landscape centers upon various subsistence or commercial land use. The riparian and tributary environments were used for subsistence and irrigation farming. Transportation networks, irrigation structures, simple domestic residences and outbuildings, and planed and terraced farmland lining the stream banks characterize these landscapes.

Flora and fauna
Despite its harsh desert environment, Big Bend has more than 1,200 species of plants (including 60 cactus species), over 600 species of vertebrates, and about 3,600 insect species. The variety of life is largely due to the diverse ecology and changes in elevation between the dry, hot desert, the cool mountains, and the fertile river valley.

Plants

The variety of cactus and other plant life add color to the Big Bend region. Cactus in the park include prickly pear (Opuntia spp.), claretcup (Echinocereus coccineus), and pitaya (E. enneacanthus). In the spring, the wildflowers are in full bloom and the yucca flowers display bright colors. Bluebonnets (Lupinus spp.) are prevalent in Big Bend, and white and pink bluebonnets are sometimes visible by the road. Other flowering plants such as the desert marigold (Baileya multiradiata), desert willow (Chilopsis linearis), ocotillo (Fouquieria splendens), rock nettle (Eucnide urens), and lechuguilla (Agave lechuguilla) abound in Big Bend.

Of particular importance to the region was the candelilla plant (Euphorbia antisyphilitica). This was used to create candelilla wax, and was the motivation for wax camps within the area of Big Bend National Park such as Glenn Springs, Texas.

Animals

Most of the animals are not visible in the day, particularly in the desert. The park comes alive at night, with many of the animals foraging for food. About 150 cougar (Puma concolor) sightings are reported per year, despite the fact that only two dozen cougars live in the park. Other species that inhabit the park include coyote (Canis latrans), kangaroo rat (Dipodomys spp.), greater roadrunner (Geococcyx californianus), golden eagle (Aquila chrysaetos), gray fox (Urocyon cinereoargenteus), collared peccary (Dicotyles tajacu), and black-tailed jackrabbit (Lepus californicus). Mexican black bears (Ursus americanus eremicus) are also present in the mountain areas.

Plans to reintroduce the Mexican wolf (Canis lupus baileyi) to Big Bend National Park were rejected in the late 1980s by the state of Texas. Disagreement over the reintroduction included the question of whether the park contained enough prey animals, such as deer and javelinas, to sustain a wolf population.

Birds

More than 450 species of birds have been recorded at Big Bend NP.

Eight basic land-cover types occur at the park. In order of predominance, they are desert shrubland, igneous grassland, limestone grassland, riparian vegetation, montane woodland, bare ground, developed areas, and surface water.

Birders flock to the park, as it is home to the only area in the United States within the breeding range of the Colima warbler (Leiothlypis crissalis). The colima warbler arrives in the Chisos Mountains in mid-April to summer in the high canyons of the mountains. By mid-September, it returns to its wintering grounds in southwestern Mexico. The species is a ground nester and prefers the oak-maple habitat found in Boot Canyon and similar high, cool areas from Laguna Meadow to Boot Canyon and the South Rim. The first U.S. record of the northern tufted flycatcher (Mitrephanes phaeocercus), a Central American species, was from this site in November 1991.

Hot springs

There are several hot springs in the park, including the springs in the Hot Springs Historic District. The main hot spring is simply called Hot Springs; it is also known as Bocadillas hot springs and Langford hot springs. Hot Springs is on the National Register of Historic Places. The hot springs were the first major tourist attraction in the Big Bend area, before the national park was established. In 1909, J.O. Langford began developing the springs. There was a small stone soaking tub of local stone from the time before Langford's development was excavated at the site. A dugout shelter existed at the site that was renovated by the Langford family as a residence. The Langfords then constructed an adobe house, a stone bathhouse, and bathing shelters made of brushwood. Later in 1927 they rebuilt the bathhouse, and built a store and a motor court with seven attached cabins.

Tourism

Big Bend is one of the largest, most remote, and one of the least-visited national parks in the contiguous United States. In the 10-year period from 2009 to 2019, an average of 377,154 visitors entered the park annually.

Big Bend's primary attraction is its hiking and backpacking trails. Particularly notable among these are the Chimneys Trail, which visits a rock formation in the desert; the Marufo Vega trail, a loop trail that passes through scenic canyons on the way to and from the Rio Grande; the South Rim trail which circles the high mountains of the Chisos; and the Outer Mountain Loop trail in the Chisos, which incorporates parts of the South Rim loop, descends into the desert along the Dodson Trail, and then returns to the Chisos Basin, completing a 30-mile loop. Other notable locations include Santa Elena Canyon, Grapevine Hills, and the Mule Ears, two imposing rock towers in the middle of the desert. Professional backpacking guide services provide trips in the park.

The park administers  of the Rio Grande for recreational use. Professional river outfitters provide tours of the river. Use of a personal boat is permitted, but a free river float permit is required.  In June 2009, the Department of Homeland Security began treating all float trips as trips that had left the country and required participants to have an acceptable form of identification such as a passport to re-enter the country.

Visitors often cross the Rio Grande to visit the Mexican village of Boquillas. The Department of Homeland Security closed the border crossing in 2002 due to increased security following the September 11 attacks, but in April 2013, the Boquillas crossing reopened as an official Class B Port of Entry between the U.S. and Mexico. It is open Wednesday through Sunday between 9 am and 6 pm.

With more than 450 species of birds recorded in the park, a widely popular activity is birdwatching. Many species stop in the park during their annual migrations.

Five paved roads are in Big Bend. Persimmon Gap to Panther Junction is a  road from the north entrance of the park to park headquarters at Panther Junction. Panther Junction to Rio Grande Village is a  road that descends  from the park headquarters to the Rio Grande. Maverick Entrance Station to Panther Junction is a  route from the western entrance of the park to the park headquarters. The  Ross Maxwell Scenic Drive leads to the Castolon Historic District and Santa Elena Canyon.

International dark-sky park 

In 2012, the park was designated an international dark-sky park by the International Dark-Sky Association. The association also recognized the park with its Gold Tier designation as "free from all but the most minor impacts of light pollution." Measurements made by the National Park Service show that Big Bend has the darkest skies in the contiguous United States. Thousands of stars, bright planets, and the Milky Way are visible on clear nights.

Education
San Vicente Independent School District is based on the park grounds. San Vicente ISD's facility moved to the Panther Junction area circa 1951 so children of park employees had a local school. Much of the park is in San Vicente ISD while other parts are physically in Terlingua Common School District. High school aged students from San Vicente ISD attend high school at Big Bend High School of Terlingua CSD.

Prior to 1996 Alpine High School of the Alpine Independent School District served as the high school for students from Terlingua CSD, and also for students of San Vicente ISD. The high school opened in 1996. San Vicente began sending students to Big Bend High when it was established,

See also

 List of national parks of the United States
 List of birds of Big Bend National Park
 Big Bend
 Big Bend Ranch State Park
 Chihuahuan Desert
 Chisos Mountains
 Guadalupe Mountains
 Marathon, Texas
 Mexico–United States international park
 McKittrick Canyon
 Pecos River
 Rio Grande Wild and Scenic River
 Terlingua, Texas
 Trans-Pecos
 West Texas

References

Bibliography
 Gómez, Arthur R. (1990) A Most Singular Country: A History of Occupation in the Big Bend. Charles Redd Center for Western Studies; Brigham Young University.
 Jameson, John R. (1996) The Story of Big Bend National Park. University of Texas Press.
 Maxwell, Ross A. (1968) The Big Bend of the Rio Grande: A Guide to the Rocks, Landscape, Geologic History, and Settlers of the Area of Big Bend National Park. Bureau of Economic Geology; University of Texas.

External links

  of the National Park Service (NPS)
 NPS park maps
 Big Bend National Park - NPS Discover Our Shared Heritage travel itinerary
 Castolon: A Meeting Place of Two Cultures - NPS Teaching with Historic Places (TwHP) lesson plan
 "Big Bend National Park" - a 1940s promotional film for the park
 Big Bend National Park at Americansouthwest.net

 
National parks in Texas
Archaeological sites in Texas
Protected areas of Brewster County, Texas
Rio Grande
Protected areas of the Chihuahuan Desert
Biosphere reserves of the United States
Protected areas established in 1944
1944 establishments in Texas